Have Your Cake and Eat It is a British romantic drama mini-series which was broadcast every Saturday and Sunday on BBC1 from 15 to 23 March 1997. The four-episode series was directed by Paul Seed and co-produced by Dave Edwards and Eileen Quinn. The show starred Miles Anderson as Sam Dawson, a middle-aged executive in the roller coaster industry. The plot follows Sam Dawson's affair with a younger woman, Allie Grey (Holly Aird), and the impact on his marriage with Charlotte Dawson (Sinéad Cusack). The series simultaneously followed the affair and Sam’s professional pursuit of building a roller coaster called "Dragon Khan." The series co-starred Paul Brooke, David de Keyser, Ian McNeice, and James Purefoy. It was conceived by actor and television writer Rob Heyland, writer of Between the Lines and Wycliffe.

Cast 
 Sinéad Cusack – Charlotte Dawson
 Miles Anderson – Sam Dawson
 Holly Aird – Allie Gray
 Paul Brooke – Stimpson
 David de Keyser – Michael
 Ian McNeice – Zief
 James Purefoy – Ben
 Guy Faulkner – Stephen Dawson
 Honeysuckle Weeks – Sophie Dawson
 Max Dawson – Jay Dawson
 Holly Oppe – Polly Dawson
 Imogen Oppe – Molly Dawson
 Sally Dexter – Diane
 James Bolam – Nat Oliver
 Rebecca Front – Claire Gray
 Kate Blackham – Doreen
 Philip Glenister – Joe Martin
 Paul Mateu – Carlos
 Wolf Kahler – Gunther
 Toby Harper – Jose Maria

Episodes

Awards 
Sinead Cusack won the Royal Television Society Award for Best Actress in 1998, while Miranda Richardson also received a nomination in the same category.

References

External links 

1997 British television series debuts
1997 British television series endings
1990s British drama television series
1990s British romance television series
1990s British television miniseries
BBC television dramas
Television series by Banijay
English-language television shows
Television shows set in Surrey
Television shows set in Spain